Darkside of the Sun is the second compilation album by German rock band Tokio Hotel, released exclusively in  Japan. It was released February 2, 2011 after the success of the song "Darkside of the Sun" in Japan. The band won Best Rock Video at 2011 MTV Video Music Aid Japan for it and performed live at the ceremony.
The album is composed of songs from their studio albums Scream (2007) and Humanoid (2009). The Deluxe version also includes songs form Humanoid City Live and maxi single Ready, Set, Go!. The album was released in two versions: a standard version (13 songs) and a deluxe version (16 songs and a bonus DVD). The deluxe version bonus DVD includes eight of the band's music videos (six in English and two in German), five Tokio Hotel TV episodes and an interview with the band.

Track listing

Bonus DVD content

Music videos
 Darkside of the Sun
 Automatic
 World Behind My Wall
 Ready, Set, Go!
 Monsoon
 Scream
 Lass Uns Laufen
 Schrei

Tokio Hotel TV
 Interview above the clouds
 MTV VMA 2008: Music, mayhem, Tokio Hotel
 Dreams come true...and now it's partytime
 Intimate confessions
 Humanoid City Live

Interview
 Questions & answers

References

Tokio Hotel albums
2011 albums